Hothead may refer to:

 "Hothead" (Courage the Cowardly Dog), a 1999 television episode
 Hothead (film), a 1979 French film
 HOTHEAD (gene), a gene in Arabidopsis thaliana that encodes a flavin adenine dinucleotide-containing oxidoreductase
 "Hothead" (Smallville episode), a 2001 television episode
 Hothead Games, an independent video game developer
 Hothead Paisan, a fictional character
 "Hothead", a song by Captain Beefheart from the album Doc at the Radar Station
 Hot Head, a character in Skylanders: Giants
Hot Head (novel), a 1992 science fiction novel by Simon Ings
 "Hot Head", a song by Death Grips from the album Bottomless Pit
 Hotheads, an album by Boiled in Lead